Brussels is a parliamentary constituency in Belgium used to elect members of the Flemish Parliament since 2004. It corresponds to the Brussels Capital Region.

The election coincides with the one for the (bilingual) Brussels Parliament; voters who vote for a Dutch-language list for the Brussels Parliament can subsequently vote for members of the Flemish Parliament. This direct election was introduced in 2001; previously the members were appointed by the Dutch-speaking elected members of the Brussels Parliament.

The members elected in this district may only vote on matters for the Flemish Community, not on matters for the Flemish Region.

Representatives

References

Constituencies of the Flemish Parliament